Baba Qodrat (also Romanized as Bābā Qodrat; also known as Emāmzādeh Bābā Qodrat) is a village in Bam Rural District, Bam and Safiabad District, Esfarayen County, North Khorasan Province, Iran. At the 2006 census, its population was 16, in 5 families.

References 

Populated places in Esfarayen County